Remembrance Days in Slovakia are working days.

For Public holidays in Slovakia see National holidays in Slovakia.

Society of Slovakia
Slovak culture